Louis Kossuth Church (December 11, 1846November 23, 1897) was an American politician who was a New York Supreme Court justice, a member of the New York Legislature, and the ninth and penultimate Governor of Dakota Territory, serving from 1887 to 1889.

Biography
Louis K. Church was born in Brooklyn, New York on December 11, 1846. He was educated at the Hudson River Institute at Claverack, New York. After studying law at the office of Judge N. B. Moore, Church was admitted to the bar. He practiced law with Judge Moore until eventually practicing by himself in 1874. Church was a member of the New York State Assembly (Queens Co., 1st D.) in 1883, 1884 and 1885. Then, President Cleveland appointed Church as judge in the Third District of Dakota Territory, replacing Seward Smith, whose mental health had come into question.

Because of Church's good reputation as a judge, President Cleveland appointed Louis Church as Governor of Dakota Territory. A number of Democrats in Dakota Territory were disappointed in the appointment because they had expected the appointment of Dakota resident Frank M. Ziebach. Church became governor on February 21, 1887. He scrutinized every bill and restrained excessive spending with his veto power. He allowed the reform school to be established at Plankinton. Church opposed the division of Dakota Territory into two separate states. Governor Church and former Governors, Nehemiah G. Ordway and John L. Pennington, wanted Dakota to enter the Union as a single state.

In spite of his integrity, Church became very unpopular as governor because of his opposition to separate statehood. When Benjamin Harrison defeated Cleveland as president, Church became a lame duck who was generally ignored by the territorial legislature. On March 4, 1889, Harrison was inaugurated as president, and Church resigned as governor on March 9, 1889.

After leaving office, Louis Church returned to practicing law, first in Huron and then in Everett, Washington. He died after developing pneumonia during a trip to Juneau, Alaska on November 23, 1897.

References

External links
Louis K. Church's biography at the Historical Society of North Dakota website

1846 births
1898 deaths
19th-century American judges
19th-century American politicians
Dakota Territory judges
Deaths from pneumonia in Alaska
Governors of Dakota Territory
Democratic Party members of the New York State Assembly
People from Beadle County, South Dakota
People from Brooklyn
South Dakota Democrats